OpenVSP, also known as Open Vehicle Sketch Pad, is an open source parametric aircraft geometry tool originally developed by NASA. It can be used to create 3D models of aircraft and to support engineering analysis of those models. Predecessors to OpenVSP including VSP and Rapid Aircraft Modeler (RAM) were developed by J.R. Gloudemans and others for NASA beginning in the early 1990s.  OpenVSP v2.0 was released as open source under the NOSA license in January 2012.  Development has been led by Rob McDonald since around 2012 and has been supported by NASA and AFRL among other contributions.

OpenVSP allows the user to quickly generate computer models from ideas, which can then be analyzed. As such, it is especially powerful in generating and evaluating unconventional design concepts.

Features

User interface
OpenVSP displays a graphical user interface upon launch. A workspace window and a "Geometry Browser" window open. The workspace is where the model is displayed while the Geometry Browser lists individual components in the workspace, such as fuselage and wings. These components can be selected, added or deleted, somewhat like a feature tree in CAD software such as Solidworks. When a component is selected in the Geometry Browser window, a component geometry window opens.  This window is used to modify the component.

OpenVSP also provides API capabilities which may be accessed using Matlab, Python or AngelScript.

Geometry modelling
OpenVSP offers a multitude of basic geometries, common to aircraft modelling, which users modify and assemble to create models. Wing, pod, fuselage, and propeller are a few available geometries. Advanced components like body of revolution, duct, conformal geometry and such are also available.

Analysis tools
Besides the geometry modeller, OpenVSP contains multiple tools that help with aerodynamic or structural analysis of models. The tools available are:

 CompGeom - mesh generation tool that can handle model intersection and trimming

 Mass Properties Analysis - to compute properties like centre of gravity and moment of inertia
 Projected Area Analysis - to compute project area
 CFD Mesh - to generate meshes that may be used in Computational fluid dynamics analysis software
 FEA Mesh - to generate meshes that may be used in FEA analysis software
 DegenGeom - to generate various simplified representations of geometry models like point, beam and camber surface models
 VSPAERO - for vortex lattice or panel method based aerodynamic and flight dynamic analysis

 Wave Drag Analysis - for estimating wave drag of geometries
 Parasite Drag Analysis - for estimating parasite drag of geometries based on parameters like wetted area and skin friction coefficient 
 Surface fitting - for fitting a parametric surface to a point cloud
 Texture Manager - for applying image textures to geometry for aiding visualization

Compatibility with other software
OpenVSP permits import of multiple geometry formats like STL, CART3D (.tri) and PLOT3D.
Point clouds may also be imported and used to fit a parametric surface.

Geometry created in OpenVSP may be exported as STL, CART3D (.tri), PLOT3D, STEP and IGES, OBJ, SVG, DXF and X3D file formats. These file formats allow geometries to be used for mesh generation and in CFD or FEA software.

OpenVSP Hangar
OpenVSP Hangar provides users a place to upload models and promotes sharing of geometry created in OpenVSP. Each model is allowed revisions with accompanying details on source quality.

OpenVSP Ground School
OpenVSP Ground School is a set of comprehensive tutorials under development by Brandon Litherland at NASA. Ground school tutorials provide details on OpenVSP features and techniques, along with tutorials for beginner and advanced users.

References

Free and open-source software